Ghost Song is a 2022 video game developed by Old Moon and published by Humble Games for Microsoft Windows, Nintendo Switch, PlayStation 4, PlayStation 5, Xbox One, and Xbox Series X/S.

Gameplay 
Gameplay follows a Metroidvania style format. The game features a system where use of ranged attacks allows the player to increase the strength of their melee attacks.

Development 
The studio Old Moon handled development, while Humble Games handled publishing.

Development of Ghost Song began in 2013, with early funding coming from a Kickstarter crowdfunding campaign. A Wii U port was considered, despite incompatibilities between OpenFL and the console. The games Super Metroid and Dark Souls were noted as influences by the developer. Over the course of development, the game was developed in three different fundamental platforms, starting as a Flash game before being ported to the Stencyl engine, before finally being ported to Unity for the release version.

Ghost Song was released on November 3, 2022. The game was made available on Xbox Game Pass on launch.

Reception 

Ghost Song received "generally favorable reviews" according to Metacritic.
A Rock Paper Shotgun review was overall positive, noting that the game had issues with leading the player. A review from PC Gamer was more critical, noting that the death system of the game was flawed and could lead to a "Catch 22", while also noting that the fundamental systems of the game were sound yet overall repetitive.

References 

2022 video games
Metroidvania games
Windows games
Nintendo Switch games
Xbox One games
Indie video games
Xbox Series X and Series S games
PlayStation 4 games
PlayStation 5 games
Cancelled Wii U games